Peter Rohde (born 19 November 1964) is a former Australian Football League (AFL) player and coach.

Playing career

Carlton
Rohde came from the Bendigo region and made his Victorian Football League (VFL) debut for Carlton Football Club in 1985. He played total of 46 games and kicked six goals for the club from 1985 until 1987. Rohde left Carlton at the end of the 1987 season, because the Carlton coach Robert Walls had a low opinion of Rohde's playing ability and dropped him from the side during the 1987 finals campaign, when Carlton ended up winning the premiership.

Melbourne
Rohde transferred to Melbourne Football Club, where he played 117 games and kicked 22 goals from 1988 until he retired in 1995. The Melbourne coach John Northey had a high opinion of Rohde's playing ability, but Rohde was plagued by injury.

Coaching career

Norwood 
Rohde achieved success as senior coach of Norwood in the South Australian National Football League, taking the club to a premiership in 1997.

Western Bulldogs 
Rohde became assistant coach at the Western Bulldogs. Towards the end of the 2002 season, the resignation of senior coach Terry Wallace led to Rohde being made caretaker coach for the final-round clash with Collingwood at the MCG in Round 22, 2002, which the Bulldogs won. Rohde was then appointed to the position of full-time senior coach. In the 2003 season, the Bulldogs under Rohde struggled and 16th, for the wooden spoon with three wins, eighteen losses and one draw. In the 2004 season the Bulldogs under Rohde struggled again and finished 14th with five wins and seventeen losses. Rohde was sacked towards the end of the 2004 season, with four matches to go, but he agreed to stay and coach for the rest of the season. Rohde coached Western Bulldogs in 45 games with nine wins and 35 losses and one draw, a winning percentage of 20 per cent. Rohde then replaced by Rodney Eade as Western Bulldogs senior coach.

Port Adelaide Football Operations Manager 
Rohde then went to Port Adelaide Football Club, serving as Football Operations Manager from the end of 2004 until the end of the 2014 season.

Personal life
Rohde has three children, Matthew, Ashleigh and Ella, and is married to Robyn.

References

External links 
 Blueseum profile
 Demon Wiki profile

1964 births
Living people
Melbourne Football Club players
Carlton Football Club players
Western Bulldogs coaches
Norwood Football Club coaches
Sandhurst Football Club players
Australian rules footballers from Victoria (Australia)